The Govt.College of Engineering Munnar is situated in the Munnar hillstation of the State of Kerala, India. College of Engineering Munnar is an Institute of higher learning established by Government of Kerala and is managed by the Center for Continuing Education Kerala ( CCEK ). The Institution was started in the year 2000 and is affiliated to APJ Abdul Kalam Technological University Kerala from 2015 admission onwards. The college is approved by All India Council for Technical Education (AICTE), New Delhi. It is one of the finest engineering institutions in Kerala.The Chairman of the Governing Body of the institution is the Hon’ble Minister for Education, Government of Kerala and the Vice-Chairman is the Principal Secretary (Higher Education) Government of Kerala.

Since its inception, CEM has been priding itself on creating professional opportunities for its students and equipping them to become highly successful on their chosen field. Located in one of the most livable cities in the world, and associated with one of the finest universities in the region, the campus attracts students from all over the country. It is established in 26 acres of land in the Kannan Devan hills, just one kilometer of Munnar town.

Location
CEM is located in the picturesque hill station of South India Munnar. The college campus is right in Munnar Town. Munnar is well connected by road to all major towns in the state as well as nearby states. The college which is naturally air conditioned, offers the best environment for studying.

Courses
The following undergraduate/graduate courses are conducted at CEM:

BTech (Bachelor of Technology)
Electronics and Communication Engineering
Computer Science and Engineering
Electrical and Electronics Engineering
Mechanical Engineering

MTech (Master of Technology)
VLSI & Embedded Systems
Computer and Information Science
Power electronics

Admissions 
Allotment to 85% seats of the annual intake is made by the Commissioner for Entrance examination (CEE), Government of Kerala from the rank list of Kerala Engineering Entrance examination conducted every year by Govt. of Kerala.

Technical organizations

IEEE Student Chapter 
CEM has one of the most active IEEE student branches in the state.

India's First High Altitude Research Centre 
India's first High Altitude Research Centre for weather study is located inside the campus. This is a joint venture of Directorate of Environment and Climate Change, IIT Madras and Centre for Continuing Education Kerala on behalf of College of Engineering Munnar. The agreement signed by the trio will surely bring revolutionary change in the field of climate change. The location of the college is best suited for the establishment of Research Centre.

Pollution and the associated climate change are major concerns of the current millennium. These factors will both significantly and negatively impact our quality of life if left unattended. The study of these two areas is therefore absolutely relevant and necessary.

To this end, Professor Sachin S Gunthe and his team wish to establish a pollution monitoring lab in Munnar. Munnar is very strategically located, being far from roads and urban areas; the data obtained is to be compared with that obtained from urban areas to estimate the impact of increasing pollution on the regional climate of South India. Studies have already been performed on the campus of the College of Engineering, Munnar and so far three papers have been published in top quality peer reviewed journals.

References

External links
 

Engineering colleges in Kerala
All India Council for Technical Education
Universities and colleges in Idukki district
Educational institutions established in 2000
2000 establishments in Kerala
Munnar